Kreis Znin was one of many Kreise (counties) in the northern administrative region of Bromberg, in the Prussian province of Posen, from 1887-1919. Its capital was Znin.

History 

Kreis Znin was created in 1887 out of parts of Kreis Schubin, Kreis Mogilno, and Kreis Wongrowitz. The end of the 19th century was a period of intensive economic development for both urban and rural areas. A sugar factory was built in 1893-94.

Kreis Znin was part of the military command (German: Bezirkskommando) at Gnesen (Gniezno). The main court (German: Landgericht) was in Bromberg (Bydgoszcz), with a lower court (German: Amtsgericht) in the capital city Znin. Each of the cities Gonsawa, Janowitz, Rogowo, and Znin held headquarters of a police district (German: Polizeidistrikt).

Rebels from the territory participated in the Greater Poland Uprising in 1919 after World War I. The Kreis was dissolved in 1919 when the territory became part of the Second Polish Republic. During World War II, the territory of the former Kreis became Landkreis Dietfurt (Wartheland), 1939-1945.

Demographics 
According to the census of 1910, the district had a population of 40,210, of which 29,156 (72.51%) spoke Polish, 10,906 (27.12%) spoke German and 133 (0.33%) identified as bilingual.

Transportation 

A narrow-gauged railway line of the Prussian Eastern Railway through Żnin was completed from 1894-95. The first section of the 600 mm gauge Kleinbahn des Kreises Znin (local line of Znin County) opened from Znin to Rogowo (19.4 km) on 1 July 1894, together with a branch from Biskupin through Gąsawa to Szelejewo (8.2 km). On 9 June 1895 the Rogowo line was extended by 12.3 km to Ośno. In 1908 a branch to Ostrowce was added, and in 1911 a further 15.8 km branch opened to Obiecanowo. In the following year another 5.5 km branch opened to Wola, and in 1913 the Szelejewo line was extended to Grochowiska Szlacheckie.  Finally, a 2 km section from Obiecanowo to Żużoły brought the system up to 78 km.

On 1 June 1889, a railway connection to the regular railway network was completed. This provided direct trains to Hohensalza (Inowrocław), Damasławek, and Rogasen (Rogoźno). By 1 November 1895 it was also connected to Bromberg.

The Wenecja Railway Museum opened in 1972, and contains a collection of at least 17 steam locomotives and a variety of rolling stock and other items.  It is situated beside the railway, but the display tracks are not connected to the running lines. The railway also runs past the archaeological museum at Biskupin.

Standesämter 
"Standesamt" is the German name of the local civil registration offices which were established in October 1874 soon after the German Empire was formed. Births, marriages and deaths were recorded. Previously, only duplicate copies of church records were used. By 1905, Kreis Znin had the following 13 offices for rural residents:

Gutenwerder district was created in 1876 from Znin district (Schubin County). Mittelwalde district was created in 1890 from Rogowo district and Klein Laski district was created from Gonsawa district. Herrnkirch district was created in 1899 from Janowitz district. Birkenfelde district was created from Gutenwerder district. Lasskirch district was created in 1905 from Janowitz district and Woycin district was created from Znin district. In addition, the following cities were separate districts for urban residents: Rogowo, Znin.

Table of all communities

Church parishes 
In 1905, these Catholic parish churches served towns in Kreis Znin:

In 1905, these Protestant parish churches served towns in Kreis Znin:

References

External links 
 List of genealogical records
 Facsimiles of registration books

Navigation Bar 

This article is part of the project Wikipedia:WikiProject Prussian Kreise. Please refer to the project page, before making changes.

Districts of the Province of Posen
1887 establishments in Germany
1919 disestablishments in Germany
Districts of Prussia